Alfred Barnard (1837–1918) was a British brewing and distilling historian.

Life and work
According to the limited family records available, Barnard was born in 1837 into a Baptist family in Thaxted, a rural village in Essex. He was one of eight children. His father was a draper and grocer.

In 1859, aged 22 he married Fanny Ruffle, also 22. At this time Alfred is thought to have been a grocer residing in Kensington. They had two daughters, Theodora and Edith, and one son, Harold. Barnard is described on the respective birth certificates as a toilet soap exporter, then a merchant and finally as a gentleman. Different addresses are given on the certificates, ranging from Islington in 1861, to the Cavendish Square area in 1869.

In the 1881 they are listed as living near Dulwich, London. Curiously, Barnard does not appear on the 1901 census.

As secretary of Harper's Weekly Gazette, he visited every working whisky distillery in Great Britain and Ireland from 1885-1887. In all, he visited 162 distilleries; 129 in Scotland, 29 in Ireland and 4 in England. The result of which was the monumental 500 page The Whisky Distilleries of the United Kingdom, covering in depth technical information on the distilleries, along with sketches and engravings. Of the original print, only a small number of copies survive to this day, some are in presentation binding (leather) but most have a green cloth binding.   Copies of the first edition have changed hands for £2,500.  However, a facsimile copy was published in 1987, and has been reprinted three times since. This book has been referred to as possibly the most important book written on whisky."

Many of the distilleries Barnard visited have since closed, and in most cases, especially in Ireland, the buildings themselves have disappeared. In other instances the surviving distillery names have changed.

Following publication of Whiskey Distilleries he was commissioned by various distilling companies to produce promotional pamphlets.  Six are known to still exist and are very rare.  They are:How to blend Scotch Whisky for Mackie & Co, Pattison's/Glenfarclas, Johnnie Walker, Watson's of Dundee, the Highland Distillers and Dalmore distillery. He also wrote a thirty four page Pamphlet for Duncan, Alderdice & Co, Newry, Co. Down who had an extensive blending business. A copy is extant in the Newry Mourne and Down, Museum, Newry Co Down. There are plans to reprint the first listed 6 pamphlets in time.

Following his first success, Barnard undertook a similar beer tour in 1889-1891 visiting over 110 breweries in Great Britain and Ireland. The end product of this tour was The noted breweries of Great Britain and Ireland, published over three years and in four volumes. They give a great description of the scale of industry at the time and also some biographies on some of the distinguished families involved, such as the Guinnesses.  Again, promotional pamphlets were produced though unlike Barnard's whisky pamphlets, which were new and original works, these appear simply to be facsimile reprints of the relevant entry in the main volumes.  In any event, the entries in Noted Breweries are generally far more extensive than those in his Distilleries volume.

He died in Croydon, South London on 31 May 1918, aged 81.

See also

Bitter
Irish whiskey
Irish stout
Scotch whisky
English whisky

BibliographyWhisky Distilleries of the United Kingdom, 1887; reprinted Birlinn Ltd (1 Jul 2007); The Noted Breweries of Great Britain and Ireland, 1891A Visit to Watson's Dundee Whisky Stores. 1891A Ramble Through Classic Canongate. 1892/3How to Blend Scotch Whisky'', 1904; reprinted 2005

References

Scotch Whisky Review
Further Information about Barnard

1837 births
1918 deaths
People from Thaxted
British historians
British male writers